Adil Jelloul (born 14 July 1982 in Ifrane) is a Moroccan road bicycle racer. He competed at the 2012 Summer Olympics in the Men's road race.

Major results

2002
 1st  Road race, National Road Championships
2004
 1st Stage 7 Tour du Maroc
2006
 2nd Road race, National Road Championships
 5th Overall Tour du Faso
 9th Overall Tour du Maroc
2007
 1st  Road race, National Road Championships
 1st  Overall Tour du Sénégal
 1st  Overall Tour du Faso
1st Stage 8
 2nd  Road race, Pan Arab Games
 4th Road race, African Road Championships
 10th Overall Tour du Maroc
2008
 1st  Road race, National Road Championships
 3rd H. H. Vice-President's Cup
2009
 1st  Road race, National Road Championships
 1st  Overall Tour of Rwanda
1st Stage 1
 4th Grand Prix of Sharm el-Sheikh
 9th Overall Tour du Faso
 10th Overall Tour du Maroc
1st Stage 4
2010
 2nd Overall Tour du Mali
1st Stage 1
 Les Challenges de la Marche Verte
2nd GP Sakia El Hamra
2nd GP Oued Eddahab
7th GP Al Massira
 4th Road race, African Road Championships
 4th Overall Tour of Rwanda
 Challenge du Prince
5th Trophée de l'Anniversaire
7th Trophée de la Maison Royale
 9th Overall Tour du Maroc
2011
 1st Overall 2010–11 UCI Africa Tour
 1st  Road race, National Road Championships
 Les Challenges Phosphatiers
1st Challenge Youssoufia
3rd Challenge Ben Guerir
5th Challenge Khouribga
 2nd Overall Tour d'Algérie
 2nd Circuit d'Alger
 African Road Championships
3rd  Team time trial
9th Road race
 3rd Overall La Tropicale Amissa Bongo
 3rd Overall Kwita Izina Cycling Tour
 4th Overall Tour du Maroc
 Challenge du Prince
4th Trophée Princier
4th Trophée de l'Anniversaire
4th Trophée de la Maison Royale
2012
 2nd Time trial, National Road Championships
 2nd Overall Tour d'Algérie
 2nd Overall Tour du Maroc
 Les Challenges Phosphatiers
2nd Challenge Youssoufia
4th Challenge Khouribga
 Challenge du Prince
2nd Trophée de l'Anniversaire
4th Trophée Princier
 3rd Overall La Tropicale Amissa Bongo
 Les Challenges de la Marche Verte
3rd GP Al Massira
6th GP Sakia El Hamra
 4th Overall Czech Cycling Tour
 5th Circuit d'Alger
2013
 1st Overall 2012–13 UCI Africa Tour
 Les Challenges de la Marche Verte
1st GP Oued Eddahab
4th GP Sakia El Hamra
4th GP Al Massira
 Challenge du Prince
1st Trophée Princier
2nd Trophée de l'Anniversaire
5th Trophée de la Maison Royale
 2nd Overall Tour de Tipaza
1st Points classification
 3rd Road race, National Road Championships
 7th Overall Tour du Maroc
 8th Overall Tour d'Algérie
2014
 1st  Road race, National Road Championships
 2nd Overall Jelajah Malaysia
 4th Melaka Chief Minister's Cup
 9th Overall Sharjah International Cycling Tour
 10th Overall Tour of Thailand
2015
 5th Overall Tour d'Egypte
 8th Road race, African Road Championships
 8th Overall Tour du Maroc
2016
 1st  Overall Sharjah International Cycling Tour
1st Stage 1 (TTT)
 6th Overall La Tropicale Amissa Bongo
1st Stage 4

References

External links

Moroccan male cyclists
1982 births
Living people
Olympic cyclists of Morocco
Cyclists at the 2012 Summer Olympics